XHEPS-FM is a radio station on 102.1 FM in Guaymas, Sonora. It is owned by Grupo Radio Guaymas and is known as La Super Grupera with a grupera format.

History
XEPS-AM 1400, based in Empalme, received its concession on January 9, 1969. The 500-watt day/250-watt night station was owned by Hugo Águilar Flores. By the 1980s, it was sold to Radio Amistad de Sonora and broadcast on 710 kHz, with a higher daytime power of 1,000 watts.

XEPS migrated to FM in 2010 as XHEPS-FM 102.1.

References

Radio stations in Sonora